Albert Janesch (12 June 1889 – 10 May 1973) was an Austrian painter. His work was part of the painting event in the art competition at the 1936 Summer Olympics.

Honours and awards

Foreign honours
 : Officer of the Order of the White Lion (1934)

References

1889 births
1973 deaths
20th-century Austrian painters
Austrian male painters
Olympic competitors in art competitions
Artists from Vienna
Officers of the Order of the White Lion
20th-century Austrian male artists